The  Parvis de la Défense  is a square in Puteaux, located in the heart of the La Défense district, extending up to the Grande Arche.

In the old division of the district, it belonged to sector 4; since the implementation of a new plan by the EPGD in 2009, it has been located on the border between the Arche Nord and Arche Sud sectors

Rectangular in shape, it follows in its length the orientation of the Axe historique, of which it occupies a section of about 300 meters; from Paris, it is preceded by Place de la Défense (to the east), and the perspective is extended by the Grande Arche (to the west). In width, it stretches 120 meters between the CNIT in the north and the Quatre Temps shopping center in the south. In total, it covers an area of 3.6 hectares.

Just under the slab is the exchange room for the RER (La Défense station, line A), the metro (La Défense station, terminus of line 1), the Transilien (line U and line L) and the tramway (line 2 station).

References

External links

 Le Parvis

La Défense
Financial districts in France
Central business districts in France
Economy of Paris
Tourist attractions in Hauts-de-Seine